LINK is a British interbank network. It is the largest interbank network in United Kingdom.

Network
The network counts 38 member institutions, of which many are various banks and building societies issuing LINK cash cards, and the remainder are independent cash machine operators who do not issue cards. The network connects over 70,000 cash machines – virtually every cash machine in the United Kingdom.

The LINK scheme is administered by LINK Scheme Ltd., based in Leeds, Yorkshire.

The LINK network infrastructure is operated by Vocalink, a company formed in 2007 by the merger of LINK Interchange Network Limited and Voca Limited. The LINK cash machine scheme is a separate entity which is run by the scheme members.

In addition to providing the core cash machine transaction switching and settlement service to LINK network members, VocaLink provides outsourced cash machine, card and mobile payment services and provides access to Post Office counters for basic banking transactions.

UK issued debit cards generally come with a LINK EMV application in addition to a point-of-sale EMV application that can be Visa Debit, Debit MasterCard, Maestro, Visa Electron or UnionPay applications.

As of 2016, there were about 54,000 free to use cash machines, of which 23,600 were provided by independent suppliers, and 16,000 cash machines that charge for withdrawals. Throughout 2016 and 2017 discussions were ongoing over a new charging system, as larger LINK members considered the interchange fee too high.

See also
ATM usage fees
Euro Alliance of Payment Schemes

References

External links
 VocaLink Home page
LINK UK homepage

Interbank networks
Financial services companies of the United Kingdom
1985 establishments in the United Kingdom